The economy of Germany is a highly developed social market economy. It has the largest national economy in Europe, the fourth-largest by nominal GDP in the world, and fifth by GDP (PPP). In 2017, the country accounted for 28% of the euro area economy according to the International Monetary Fund (IMF). Germany is a founding member of the European Union and the Eurozone.

In 2016, Germany recorded the highest trade surplus in the world, worth $310 billion. This economic result made it the biggest capital exporter globally. Germany is one of the largest exporters globally with $1810.93 billion worth of goods and services exported in 2019. The service sector contributes around 70% of the total GDP, industry 29.1%, and agriculture 0.9%. Exports accounted for 41% of national output. The top 10 exports of Germany are vehicles, machinery, chemical goods, electronic products, electrical equipment, pharmaceuticals, transport equipment, basic metals, food products, and rubber and plastics. The economy of Germany is the largest manufacturing economy in Europe, and it is less likely to be affected by a financial downturn. Germany conducts applied research with practical industrial value and sees itself as a bridge between the latest university insights and industry-specific product and process improvements. It generates a great deal of knowledge in its own laboratories.

Germany is rich in timber, lignite, potash and salt. Some minor sources of natural gas are being exploited in the state of Lower Saxony. Until the German reunification, the German Democratic Republic mined for uranium in the Ore Mountains (see also: SAG/SDAG Wismut). Energy in Germany is sourced predominantly by fossil fuels (30%), with wind power in second place, then nuclear power, gas, solar, biomass (wood and biofuels) and hydro. Germany is the first major industrialized nation to commit to the renewable energy transition called Energiewende. Germany is the leading producer of wind turbines in the world. Renewables produced 46% of electricity consumed in Germany (as of 2019).
99 percent of all German companies belong to the German "Mittelstand", small and medium-sized enterprises, which are mostly family-owned. Of the world's 2000 largest publicly listed companies measured by revenue, the Fortune Global 2000, 53 are headquartered in Germany, with the Top 10 being Allianz, Daimler, Volkswagen, Siemens, BMW, Deutsche Telekom, Bayer, BASF, Munich Re and SAP.

Germany is the world's top location for trade fairs. Around two thirds of the world's leading trade fairs take place in Germany. The largest annual international trade fairs and congresses are held in several German cities such as Hanover, Frankfurt, Cologne, Leipzig and Düsseldorf.

History

Age of Industrialization

The Industrial Revolution in Germany got underway approximately a century later than in the United Kingdom, France, and Belgium, partly because Germany only became a unified country in 1871.The establishment of the Deutscher Zollverein (German Customs Union) in 1834 and the expansion of railway systems were the main drivers of Germany's industrial development and political union. From 1834, tariff barriers between increasing numbers of the Kleindeutschland German states were eliminated. In 1835 the first German railway linked the Franconian cities of Nuremberg and Fürth – it proved so successful that the decade of the 1840s saw "railway mania" in all the German states. Between 1845 and 1870,  of rail had been built and in 1850 Germany was building its own locomotives. Over time, other German states joined the customs union and started linking their railroads, which began to connect the corners of Germany. The growth of free trade and a rail system across Germany intensified economic development which opened up new markets for local products, created a pool of middle managers, increased the demand for engineers, architects, and skilled machinists, and stimulated investments in coal and iron.

Another factor that propelled German industry forward was the unification of the monetary system, made possible in part by political unification. The Deutsche Mark, a new monetary coinage system backed by gold, was introduced in 1871. However, this system did not fully come into use as silver coins retained their value until 1907.

The victory of Prussia and her allies over Napoleon III of France in the Franco-Prussian War of 1870-1871 marked the end of French hegemony in Europe and resulted in the proclamation of the German Empire in 1871. The establishment of the empire inherently presented Europe with the reality of a new populous and industrializing polity possessing a considerable, and undeniably increasing, economic and diplomatic presence. The influence of French economic principles produced important institutional reforms in Germany, including the abolition of feudal restrictions on the sale of large landed estates, the reduction of the power of the guilds in the cities, and the introduction of a new, more efficient commercial law. Nonetheless, political decisions about the economy of the empire were still largely controlled by a coalition of "rye and iron", that is the Prussian Junker landowners of the east and the Ruhr heavy industry of the west.

Regarding politics and society, between 1881 and 1889 Chancellor Otto von Bismarck promoted laws that provided social insurance and improved working conditions. He instituted the world's first welfare state. Germany was the first to introduce social insurance programs including universal healthcare, compulsory education, sickness insurance, accident insurance, disability insurance, and a retirement pension. Moreover, the government's universal education policy bore fruit with Germany achieving the highest literacy rate in the world – 99% – education levels that provided the nation with more people good at handling numbers, more engineers, chemists, opticians, skilled workers for its factories, skilled managers, knowledgeable farmers, and skilled military personnel.

By 1900 Germany surpassed Britain and the United States in steel production. The German economic miracle was also intensified by unprecedented population growth from 35 million in 1850 to 67 million in 1913. From 1895 to 1907, the number of workers engaged in machine building doubled from half a million to well over a million. Only 40 percent of Germans lived in rural areas by 1910, a drop from 67% at the birth of the Empire. Industry accounted for 60 percent of the gross national product in 1913. The German chemical industry became the most advanced in the world, and by 1914 the country was producing half the world's electrical equipment.

The rapid advance to industrial maturity led to a drastic shift in Germany's economic situation – from a rural economy into a major exporter of finished goods. The ratio of the finished product to total exports jumped from 38% in 1872 to 63% in 1912. By 1913 Germany had come to dominate all the European markets. By 1914 Germany had become one of the biggest exporters in the world.

Weimar Republic and Third Reich

The Nazis rose to power while unemployment was very high, but achieved full employment later thanks to massive public works programs such as the Reichsbahn, Reichspost and the Reichsautobahn projects. In 1935 rearmament in contravention of the Treaty of Versailles added to the economy.

The post-1931 financial crisis economic policies of expansionary fiscal policies (as Germany was off the gold standard) was advised by their non-Nazi Minister of Economics, Hjalmar Schacht, who in 1933 became the president of the central bank. Hjalmar Schacht later abdicated from the post in 1938 and was replaced by Hermann Göring.

The trading policies of the Third Reich aimed at self-sufficiency but with a lack of raw materials Germany would have to maintain trade links but on bilateral preferences, foreign exchange controls, import quotas, and export subsidies under what was called the "New Plan"(Neuer Plan) of 19 September 1934. The "New Plan" was based on trade with less developed countries who would trade raw materials for German industrial goods saving currency. Southern Europe was preferable to Western Europe and North America as there could be no trade blockades. This policy became known as the Grosswirtschaftsraum ("greater economic area") policy.

Eventually, the Nazi party developed strong relationships with big business and abolished trade unions in 1933 in order to form the Reich Labor Service (RAD), German Labor Front (DAF) to set working hours, Beauty of Labour (SDA) which set working conditions and Strength through Joy (KDF) to ensure sports clubs for workers.

West Germany

Beginning with the replacement of the Reichsmark with the Deutsche Mark as legal tender, a lasting period of low inflation and rapid industrial growth was overseen by the government led by German Chancellor Konrad Adenauer and his minister of economics, Ludwig Erhard, raising West Germany from total wartime devastation to one of the most developed nations in modern Europe.

In 1953 it was decided that Germany was to repay $1.1 billion of the aid it had received. The last repayment was made in June 1971.

Apart from these factors, hard work and long hours at full capacity among the population in the 1950s, 1960s, and early 1970s and extra labor supplied by thousands of Gastarbeiter ("guest workers") provided a vital base for the economic upturn.

East Germany

By the early 1950s, the Soviet Union had seized reparations in the form of agricultural and industrial products and demanded further heavy reparation payments. Silesia with the Upper Silesian Coal Basin, and Stettin, a prominent natural port, were lost to Poland.

Exports from West Germany exceeded $323 billion in 1988. In the same year, East Germany exported $30.7 billion worth of goods; 65% to other communist states. East Germany had zero unemployment.

Federal Republic

The German economy practically stagnated in the beginning of the 2000s. The worst growth figures were achieved in 2002 (+1.4%), in 2003 (+1.0%) and in 2005 (+1.4%). Unemployment was also chronically high. Due to these problems, together with Germany's aging population, the welfare system came under considerable strain. This led the government to push through a wide-ranging program of belt-tightening reforms, Agenda 2010, including the labor market reforms known as Hartz I - IV.

In the later part of the first decade of 2000, the world economy experienced high growth, from which Germany as a leading exporter also profited. Some credit the Hartz reforms with achieving high growth and declining unemployment but others contend that they resulted in a massive decrease in standards of living and that its effects are limited and temporary.

The nominal GDP of Germany contracted in the second and third quarters of 2008, putting the country in a technical recession following a global and European recession cycle. German industrial output dropped to 3.6% in September vis-à-vis August. In January 2009 the German government under Angela Merkel approved a €50 billion ($70 billion) economic stimulus plan to protect several sectors from a downturn and a subsequent rise in unemployment rates. Germany exited the recession in the second and third quarters of 2009, mostly due to rebounding manufacturing orders and exports - primarily from outside the Euro Zone - and relatively steady consumer demand.

Germany is a founding member of the EU, the G8 and the G20, and was the world's largest exporter from 2003 to 2008. In 2011 it remained the third largest exporter and third largest importer. Most of the country's exports are in engineering, especially machinery, automobiles, chemical goods and metals. Germany is a leading producer of wind turbines and solar-power technology. Annual trade fairs and congresses are held in cities throughout Germany.
2011 was a record-breaking year for the German economy. German companies exported goods worth over €1 trillion ($1.3 trillion), the highest figure in history. The number of people in work has risen to 41.6 million, the highest recorded figure.

Through 2012, Germany's economy continued to be stronger relative to local neighboring nations.

Data 
The following table shows the main economic indicators in 1980–2021 (with IMF staff estimates in 2022–2027). Inflation below 5% is in green.

Companies

Of the world's 500 largest stock-market-listed companies measured by revenue in 2010, the Fortune Global 500, 37 are headquartered in Germany. 30 Germany-based companies are included in the DAX, the most popular German stock market index. Well-known global brands are Mercedes-Benz, BMW, SAP, Siemens, Volkswagen, Adidas, Audi, Allianz, Porsche, Bayer, BASF, Bosch, and Nivea.

Germany is recognised for its specialised small and medium enterprises, known as the Mittelstand model. SMEs account for more than 99 per cent of German companies. Around 1,000 of these companies are global market leaders in their segment and are labelled hidden champions.

From 1991 to 2010, 40,301 mergers and acquisitions with an involvement of German firms with a total known value of 2,422 bil. EUR have been announced. The largest transactions since 1991 are: the acquisition of Mannesmann by Vodafone for 204.8 bil. EUR in 1999, the merger of Daimler-Benz with Chrysler to form DaimlerChrysler in 1998 valued at 36.3 bil. EUR.

Berlin (Economy of Berlin) developed an international Startup ecosystem and became a leading location for venture capital funded firms in the European Union.

The list includes the largest German companies by revenue in 2011:

Mergers and acquisitions 

Since the German reunification, there have been 52,258 mergers or acquisitions deals inbound or outbound in Germany. The most active year in terms of value was 1999 with a cumulated value of 48. bil. EUR, twice as much as the runner up which was 2006 with 24. bil. EUR (see graphic "M&A in Germany").

Here is a list of the top 10 deals (ranked by value) that include a German company. The Vodafone - Mannesmann deal is still the biggest deal in global history.

Economic region

Germany as a federation is a polycentric country and does not have a single economic center. The stock exchange is located in Frankfurt am Main, the largest Media company (Bertelsmann SE & Co. KGaA) is headquartered in Gütersloh; the largest car manufacturers are in Wolfsburg (Volkswagen), Stuttgart (Mercedes-Benz and Porsche), and Munich (Audi and BMW).

Germany is an advocate of closer European economic and political integration. Its commercial policies are increasingly determined by agreements among European Union (EU) members and EU single market legislation. Germany introduced the common European currency, the euro on 1 January 1999. Its monetary policy is set by the European Central Bank in Frankfurt.

The southern states ("Bundesländer"), especially Bayern, Baden-Württemberg, and Hessen, are economically stronger than the northern states. One of Germany's traditionally strongest (and at the same time oldest) economic regions is the Ruhr area in the west, between Duisburg and Dortmund. 27 of the country's 100 largest companies are located there. In recent years, however, the area, whose economy is based on natural resources and heavy industry, has seen a substantial rise in unemployment (2010: 8.7%).

The economy of Bayern and Baden-Württemberg, the states with the lowest number of unemployed people (2018: 2.7%, 3.1%), on the other hand, is based on high-value products. Important sectors are automobiles, electronics, aerospace, and biomedicine, among others. Baden-Württemberg is an industrial center especially for the automobile and machine-building industry and the home of brands like Mercedes-Benz (Daimler), Porsche and Bosch.

With the reunification on 3 October 1990, Germany began the major task of reconciling the economic systems of the two former republics. Interventionist economic planning ensured gradual development in eastern Germany up to the level of former West Germany, but the standard of living and annual income remains significantly higher in western German states. The modernization and integration of the eastern German economy continues to be a long-term process scheduled to last until the year 2019, with annual transfers from west to east amounting to roughly $80 billion. The overall unemployment rate has consistently fallen since 2005 and reached a 20-year low in 2012. The country in July 2014 began legislating to introduce a federally mandated minimum wage which would come into effect on 1 January 2015.

German states

Wealth

The following top 10 list of German billionaires is based on an annual assessment of wealth and assets compiled and published by Forbes magazine on 1 March 2016.

 $27.9 billion Albrecht Family
 $20.3 billion Theo Albrecht Jr.
 $18.5 billion Susanne Klatten
 $18.1 billion Georg Schaeffler
 $16.4 billion Dieter Schwarz  
 $15.6 billion Stefan Quandt
 $15.4 billion Michael Otto
 $11.7 billion Heinz Hermann Thiele
 $10 billion Klaus-Michael Kühne
 $9.5 billion Hasso Plattner

Wolfsburg is the city in Germany with the country's highest per capita GDP, at $128,000. The following top 10 list of German cities with the highest per capita GDP is based on a study by the Cologne Institute for Economic Research on 31 July 2013.

 $128,000 Wolfsburg, Lower Saxony
 $114,281 Frankfurt am Main, Hesse
 $108,347 Schweinfurt, Bavaria
 $104,000 Ingolstadt, Bavaria
 $99,389 Regensburg, Bavaria
 $92,525 Düsseldorf, North Rhine-Westphalia
 $92,464 Ludwigshafen am Rhein, Rhineland-Palatinate
 $91,630 Erlangen, Bavaria
 $91,121 Stuttgart, Baden-Württemberg
 $88,692 Ulm, Baden-Württemberg

Sectors

Germany has a social market economy characterised by a highly qualified labor force, a developed infrastructure, a large capital stock, a low level of corruption, and a high level of innovation. It has the largest national economy in Europe, the fourth largest by nominal GDP in the world, and ranked fifth by GDP (PPP) in 2015.

The service sector contributes around 70% of the total GDP, industry 29.1%, and agriculture 0.9%.

Primary
In 2010 agriculture, forestry, and mining accounted for only 0.9% of Germany's gross domestic product (GDP) and employed only 2.4% of the population, down from 4% in 1991. Agriculture is extremely productive, and Germany can cover 90% of its nutritional needs with domestic production. Germany is the third-largest agricultural producer in the European Union after France and Italy. Germany's principal agricultural products are potatoes, wheat, barley, sugar beets, fruit, and cabbages. 

Despite the country's high level of industrialization, almost one-third of its territory is covered by forest. The forestry industry provides for about two-thirds of domestic consumption of wood and wood products, so Germany is a net importer of these items.

The German soil is relatively poor in raw materials. Only lignite (brown coal) and potash salt (Kalisalz) are available in significant quantities. However, the former GDR's Wismut mining company produced a total of 230,400 tonnes of uranium between 1947 and 1990 and made East Germany the fourth-largest producer of uranium ore worldwide (largest in USSR's sphere of control) at the time. Oil, natural gas, and other resources are, for the most part, imported from other countries.

Potash salt is mined in the center of the country (Niedersachsen, Sachsen-Anhalt and Thüringen). The most important producer is K+S (formerly Kali und Salz AG).

Germany's bituminous coal deposits were created more than 300 million years ago from swamps which extended from the present-day South England, over the Ruhr area to Poland. Lignite deposits developed similarly, but during a later period, about 66 million years ago. Because the wood is not yet completely transformed into coal, brown coal contains less energy than bituminous coal.

Lignite is extracted in the extreme western and eastern parts of the country, mainly in Nordrhein-Westfalen, Sachsen and Brandenburg. Considerable amounts are burned in coal plants near the mining areas, to produce electricity. Transporting lignite over far distances is not economically feasible, therefore the plants are located practically next to the extraction sites. Bituminous coal is mined in Nordrhein-Westfalen and Saarland. Most power plants burning bituminous coal operate on imported material, therefore the plants are located not only near to the mining sites, but throughout the country.

In 2019, the country was the world's 3rd largest producer of selenium, the world's 5th largest producer of potash, the world's 5th largest producer of boron, the world's 7th largest producer of lime, the world's 13th largest producer of fluorspar, the world's 14th largest producer of feldspar, the world's 17th largest producer of graphite, the world's 18th largest producer of sulfur, in addition to being the 4th largest world producer of salt.

Industry

Industry and construction accounted for 30.7% of the gross domestic product in 2017 and employed 24.2% of the workforce. Germany excels in the production of automobiles, machinery, electrical equipment and chemicals. With the manufacture of 5.2 million vehicles in 2009, Germany was the world's fourth-largest producer and largest exporter of automobiles. German automotive companies enjoy an extremely strong position in the so-called premium segment, with a combined world market share of about 90%.

Small- to medium-sized manufacturing firms (Mittelstand companies) which specialize in technologically advanced niche products and are often family-owned form a major part of the German economy. It is estimated that about 1500 German companies occupy a top three position in their respective market segment worldwide. In about two thirds of all industry sectors German companies belong to the top three competitors.

Germany is the only country among the top five arms exporters that is not a permanent member of the United Nations Security Council.

Services

In 2017 services constituted 68.6% of gross domestic product (GDP), and the sector employed 74.3% of the workforce. The subcomponents of services are financial, renting, and business activities (30.5%); trade, hotels and restaurants, and transport (18%); and other service activities (21.7%).

Germany is the seventh most visited country in the world, with a total of 407 million overnights during 2012. This number includes 68.83 million nights by foreign visitors. In 2012, over 30.4 million international tourists arrived in Germany. Berlin has become the third most visited city destination in Europe. Additionally, more than 30% of Germans spend their holiday in their own country, with the biggest share going to Mecklenburg-Vorpommern. Domestic and international travel and tourism combined directly contribute over EUR43.2 billion to German GDP. Including indirect and induced impacts, the industry contributes 4.5% of German GDP and supports 2 million jobs (4.8% of total employment). The largest annual international trade fairs and congresses are held in several German cities such as Hannover, Frankfurt, and Berlin.

Government finances

The debt-to-GDP ratio of Germany had its peak in 2010 when it stood at 80.3% and decreased since then. According to Eurostat, the government gross debt of Germany amounts to €2,152.0 billion or 71.9% of its GDP in 2015. The federal government achieved a budget surplus of €12.1 billion ($13.1 billion) in 2015. Germany's credit rating by credit rating agencies Standard & Poor's, Moody's and Fitch Ratings stands at the highest possible rating AAA with a stable outlook in 2016.

Germany's "debt clock" (Schuldenuhr) reversed for the first time in 20 years in January 2018. It is now currently increasing at 10,424.00 per second (Oct2020).

Economists generally see Germany's current account surplus as undesirable.

Infrastructure

Energy

Germany is the world's fifth-largest consumer of energy, and two-thirds of its primary energy was imported in 2002. In the same year, Germany was Europe's largest consumer of electricity, totaling 512.9 terawatt-hours. Government policy promotes energy conservation and the development of renewable energy sources, such as solar, wind, biomass, hydroelectric, and geothermal energy. As a result of energy-saving measures, energy efficiency has been improving since the beginning of the 1970s. The government has set the goal of meeting half the country's energy demands from renewable sources by 2050. Renewable energy also plays an increasing role in the labor market: Almost 700,000 people are employed in the energy sector. About 50 percent of them work with renewable energies.

In 2000, the red-green coalition under Chancellor Schröder and the German nuclear power industry agreed to phase out all nuclear power plants by 2021. The conservative coalition under Chancellor Merkel reversed this decision in January 2010, electing to keep plants open. The nuclear disaster of the Japanese nuclear plant Fukushima in March 2011 however, changed the political climate fundamentally: Older nuclear plants have been shut down. Germany is seeking to have wind, solar, biogas, and other renewable energy sources play a bigger role, as the country looks to completely phase out nuclear power by 2022 and coal-fired power plants by 2038. Renewable energy yet still plays a more modest role in energy consumption, though German solar and wind power industries play a leading role worldwide.

In 2009, Germany's total energy consumption (not just electricity) came from the following sources:
oil 34.6%, natural gas 21.7%, lignite 11.4%, bituminous coal 11.1%, nuclear power 11.0%, hydro and wind power 1.5%, others 9.0%.

In the first half of 2021, coal, natural gas and nuclear energy comprised 56% of the total electricity fed into Germany's grid in the first half of 2021. Coal was the leader out of the conventional energy sources, comprising over 27% of Germany's electricity. Wind power's contribution to the electric grid was 22%.

There are 3 major entry points for oil pipelines: in the northeast (the Druzhba pipeline, coming from Gdańsk), west (coming from Rotterdam) and southeast (coming from Nelahozeves). The oil pipelines of Germany do not constitute a proper network, and sometimes only connect two different locations. Major oil refineries are located in or near the following cities: Schwedt, Spergau, Vohburg, Burghausen, Karlsruhe, Cologne, Gelsenkirchen, Lingen, Wilhelmshaven, Hamburg and Heide.

Germany's network of natural gas pipelines, on the other hand, is dense and well-connected. Imported pipeline gas comes mostly from Russia, the Netherlands and the United Kingdom. Although gas imports from Russia have been historically reliable, even during the cold war, recent price disputes between Gazprom and the former Soviet states, such as Ukraine, have also affected Germany. As a result, high political importance is placed on the construction of the Nord Stream 1 pipeline, running from Vyborg in Russia along the Baltic sea to Greifswald in Germany. This direct connection avoids third-party transit countries. Germany imports 50% to 75% of its natural gas from Russia.

Transport

With its central position in Europe, Germany is an important transportation hub. This is reflected in its dense and modern transportation networks. The extensive motorway (Autobahn) network ranks worldwide third largest in its total length and features a lack of blanket speed limits on the majority of routes.

Germany has established a polycentric network of high-speed trains. The InterCityExpress or ICE is the most advanced service category of the Deutsche Bahn and serves major German cities as well as destinations in neighbouring countries. The train maximum speed varies between 200 km/h and 320 km/h (125-200 mph). Connections are offered at either 30-minute, hourly, or two-hourly intervals. German railways are heavily subsidised, receiving €17.0 billion in 2014.

The largest German airports are Frankfurt Airport and Munich Airport, both are global hubs of Lufthansa. Other major airports are Berlin Brandenburg Airport, Düsseldorf, Hamburg, Hanover, Cologne/Bonn, and Stuttgart.

Technology

Germany's achievements in sciences have been significant, and research and development efforts form an integral part of the economy.

Germany is also one of the leading countries in developing and using green technologies. Companies specializing in green technology have an estimated turnover of €200 billion. German expertise in engineering, science, and research is eminently respectable.

The lead markets of Germany's green technology industry are power generation, sustainable mobility, material efficiency, energy efficiency, waste management and recycling, sustainable water management.

Regarding triadic patents, Germany is in third place after the US and Japan. With more than 26,500 registrations for patents submitted to the European Patent Office, Germany is the leading European nation. Siemens, Bosch and BASF, with almost 5,000 registrations for patents between them in 2008, are among the Top 5 of more than 35,000 companies registering patents. Together with the US and Japan, about patents for nano, bio, and new technologies Germany is one of the world's most active nations. With around one-third of triadic patents Germany leads the way worldwide in the field of vehicle emission reduction.

According to Winfried Kretschmann, who is premier of the region where Daimler is based, "China dominates the production of solar cells? Tesla is ahead in electric cars and Germany has lost the first round of digitalization to Google, Apple, and the like. Whether Germany has a future as an industrial economy will depend on whether we can manage the ecological and digital transformation of our economy".

Challenges 
Despite economic prosperity, Germany's biggest threat to future economic development is the nation's declining birthrate which is among the lowest in the world. This is particularly prevalent in parts of society with higher education. As a result, the numbers of workers are expected to decrease and the government spending needed to support pensioners and healthcare will increase if the trend is not reversed.

Less than a quarter of German people expect living conditions to improve in the coming decades.

On August 25, 2020, Federal Statistical Office of Germany revealed that the German economy plunged by 9.7% in the second quarter which is the worst on record. The latest figures show how hard the German economy was hit by the government measures in response to the COVID-19 pandemic.

Energy-intensive German industry and German exporters were hit particularly hard by the 2022 global energy crisis. Economy Minister Robert Habeck warned that the planned end of Russian energy imports will permanently raise energy prices for German industry and consumers.

See also

 Association of German Chambers of Industry and Commerce
 Codetermination in Germany
 Deutsche Bundesbank
 German Federal Association of Young Entrepreneurs
 German model
 Metropolitan regions in Germany
 List of German states by unemployment rate
 List of German cities by GDP
 Trade unions in Germany

References

Notes

Further reading

External links
 
Federal Statistical Office (Destatis)
Deutsche Bundesbank  
World Bank Germany Trade Statistics 
Germany - OECD  
Germany profile at the CIA World Factbook
Germany profile at The World Bank

 
Germany
Germany
Germany
Germany
Economies of Europe